Jelena Simić (born 19 February 1992) is an inactive Bosnian tennis player.

To date, she has won five singles titles and eight doubles titles on the ITF Women's Circuit. On 1 August 2016, she reached her best singles ranking of world No. 433. On 30 April 2018, she peaked at No. 426 in the doubles rankings.

Playing for Bosnia and Herzegovina Fed Cup team, Simić has a win–loss record of 7–14, as of December 2021.

ITF Circuit finals

Singles: 9 (5–4)

Doubles: 17 (8–9)

References

External links
 
 
 

1992 births
Living people
People from Bijeljina
Bosnia and Herzegovina female tennis players